Aleksandr Dovbnya may refer to:

 Aleksandr Dovbnya (footballer, born 1987), Russian football player
 Aleksandr Dovbnya (footballer, born 1996), Russian football player